Virbia rosenbergi is a moth in the family Erebidae first described by Walter Rothschild in 1910. It is found in Colombia and Ecuador.

References

rosenbergi
Moths described in 1910